Karbalaei may refer to:

 a demonym denoting a native or inhabitant of Karbala
 a title which is originally given to a Shia Muslim person who has successfully completed a pilgrimage to Karbala.

 Karbalaei (surname)